In and Out Social Club is located in Trenton, Mercer County, New Jersey, United States. The building was built in 1893 and was added to the National Register of Historic Places on March 26, 1987.  It was founded on September 2, 1889 for "social, intellectual, and recreative purposes."  Its significance lies primarily in that the building was designed and built specifically for a social club based in the community.  It largely retains its original appearance.

See also
National Register of Historic Places listings in Mercer County, New Jersey

References

Neoclassical architecture in New Jersey
Romanesque Revival architecture in New Jersey
Cultural infrastructure completed in 1893
Buildings and structures in Trenton, New Jersey
Clubhouses on the National Register of Historic Places in New Jersey
National Register of Historic Places in Trenton, New Jersey
New Jersey Register of Historic Places